Korean Paralympic Committee (KPC) is a National Paralympic Committee (NPC) of South Korea. The committee was established on May 12, 2006, and is recognized by International Paralympic Committee (IPC) and Asian Paralympic Committee (APC).

See also 
 Korean Sport & Olympic Committee
 Disabled sports 
 South Korea at the Paralympics 
 South Korea women's national goalball team

References

2006 establishments in South Korea
Sports organizations established in 2006
National Paralympic Committees
Para
Disability organizations based in South Korea
Parasports in South Korea
Goalball in South Korea